Lokmanya Tilak Terminus–Madurai Express is a Superfast train of the Indian Railways connecting  in Mumbai, Maharashtra with  in Tamil Nadu. It is currently being operated with 11043/11044 train numbers on a weekly basis. From May 2021, it was converted into Superfast Express, with new timings. Also ICF coach were replaced by LHB coach.

Service

The 22101/Lokmanya Tilak Terminus–Madurai Express has an average speed of 49 km/hr and covers 1694 km in 28 hrs 55 mins. 22102/Madurai–Lokmanya Tilak Terminus Express has an average speed of 47 km/hr and covers 1694 km in 28 hrs 40 mins.

Schedule

Rake sharing

 22129 – Tulsi Express
 11081 – Lokmanya Tilak Terminus–Gorakhpur Express

Route and halts 

The important halts of the train are:

Coach composition

The train consists of 23 coaches:

 1 AC Two Tier
 4 AC Three Tier
 12 Sleeper coaches
 3 General Unreserved
 2 End-On Generator coaches (EOG)

Traction

Both trains are hauled by a Kalyan Loco Shed-based WAP 7 electric locomotive from Kurla to Madurai.

Notes

External links 

 11043/Lokmanya Tilak Terminus - Madurai Express
 11044/Madurai - Lokmanya Tilak Terminus Express

References 

Express trains in India
Rail transport in Maharashtra
Rail transport in Karnataka
Rail transport in Andhra Pradesh
Rail transport in Tamil Nadu
Transport in Madurai
Transport in Mumbai